Rebeca Z. Gyumi is a Founder & Executive Director at Msichana Initiative, a Tanzanian NGO which aims to empower girls through education, and address key challenges which limit girl’s right to education. She has worked for over 8 years with Femina, a youth focused organisation, as a TV personality and youth advocate.

Early life and education
She was born in Dodoma Tanzania. She attended Mazengo Primary School in Dodoma for her primary education. She obtained her secondary school education from Kikuyu Day Secondary in Dodoma, and later went to Kilakala High School In Morogoro for high school level. She then went to University of Dar Es Salaam, where she graduated with a law degree.

Career

Rebeca Gyumi is a founder and executive director at Msichana Initiative, a local NGO which aims to empower a girl child through education, and address key challenges which limit girl’s right to education. She has worked for over 8 years with Femina, a youth focused organisation as a TV personality and youth advocate. 
A lawyer by profession, Rebeca won a landmark case on child marriages, through the petition she filed at the High Court of Tanzania to challenge the Tanzania Marriage Act, 1971 which allowed girls as young as 14 to get married. The decision which raised the minimum age of marriage to 18 for both boys and girls.

Rebeca has a vast experience working on youth engagement and advocacy; she has been at forefront advocating for various youth issues through the organisations she has been a member of and through her individual initiatives as a volunteer and ambassador. 

She has travelled to different parts of Tanzania engaging young people to discuss their pressing issues from civic engagement, sexual and reproductive health and rights and economic empowerment. Her bold character in speaking for youth issues in Tanzania gave her a platform to panel and facilitate different national and international forums with focus on youth and girls.

She has garnered trust among many youth in Tanzania which led her become chair, moderator and board member to various youth initiatives. Rebeca served as Vice-President for Tanzania Association of US State Alumni (TUSSAA), Trek4Mandela Tanzania leg ambassador  and  sits on the board of SNV-Netherlands, Opportunity for Youth Employment (OYE) project. She chaired and moderated National Youth Constitution Forum in July 2013. Forum brought together youth from Tanzania mainland and Zanzibar to discuss, evaluate and validate the draft Constitution and come up with recommendations for dissemination to reform commission. 

She chaired the National Consortium of Youth CSOs in advocating for enactment of National Youth Council, which led to the inclusion of National Youth Council in the proposed Constitution and passing of the Bill by the Parliament of United Republic of Tanzania.
In 2015 she led a girl power election campaign for the Tanzania general election, ensuring that youth and girls agenda in particular were rightly presented for politicians to take on in their manifestos, and girls in particular were encouraged and empowered to participate in the general election. This involved working with Global Peace Foundation in Tanzania and advocating for peaceful participation during election processes.
January, 2017 she participated and contributed in the 28th AU Summit with focus on youth "Harnessing the Demographic Dividend by Investments in Youth".
She paneled in the discussion "Technological Innovation: using social media to integrate social and financial education" in the Aflatoun Global Meeting, Nairobi Kenya. Where focus was on how to design youth initiative with focus on the technological advancement and use of new and social media.

In November 2013, she was selected by the US embassy in Tanzania under the US Department of state to attend International Visitors Leadership Program (IVLP) for youth with leadership potential. She won the 2017 inaugural IVLP alumni award for social innovation and change for her landmark win at the High Court.

She is known for her voice and commitment in advancing young women's rights and participation from a national, regional and international level. In 2012 she was the ambassador and coordinator for national campaign under the government through Tanzania Education Authority (TEA). The campaign aimed to fundraise for the construction of girls’ hostels in 8 regions in Tanzania and rescue girls who had to walk long distance to school, or drop out completely. 

October 2016 she was invited to be the main Speaker at UNICEF Global commemoration of International Day of a Girl Child, New York, USA. And she was awarded The Social Change Award recognizing the work done by Rebeca and the Msichana Initiative to win a landmark court case in July that ended legal provisions permitting child marriage in the country. 

She paneled with Melinda Gates to discuss about young women involvement in small-scale farming, challenges and possible solutions in 2016.

She is involved in different global campaigns for the mobilization of resources for initiatives, which works on girls’ issues. In Nov 2016 she was involved by Girls not Brides in resource mobilization for child marriage initiatives in the world. She is among 9 members across the globe of UNICEF – UNFPA advisory committee member on the global programme for ending child marriages. Rebeca is involved in different campaigns and social charities as a volunteer and ambassador, advocating for safe schools and quality education to Tanzanian students. 

Rebeca is recognized nationally and internationally for her work in advancing youth and girls' rights. She was named 2016 UNICEF global goals award winner for her work in advancing girls’ rights in Tanzania.  She was named among 2016 African Women of the Year by New African Woman magazine.  Rebeca is a Global Shaper of the World Economic Forum and University of Cape Town Young Leaders Fellow.

Awards and nominations

 Gyumi was on the list of the BBC's 100 Women announced on 23 November 2020.

References

1986 births
Living people
Tanzanian women lawyers
University of Dar es Salaam alumni
BBC 100 Women